The Stradbally Woodland Railway is a 1 km (0.62 mile) long single-track  narrow gauge railway line at Stradbally Hall in Stradbally, County Laois in Ireland.

Location 
The Stradbally Woodland Railway is located in the fenced-off grounds of Stradbally Hall near Stradbally fire station. The line is open to the public on all Bank Holiday week-end Sundays and Mondays from Easter to October and on selected other days in connection with other local events. On other days it is accessible by appointment only, because the grounds of Stradbally Hall are surrounded by a high wall with remotely operated locked gates.

History 
This narrow gauge railway is the oldest established heritage railway in Ireland. It is operated and managed by the Irish Steam Preservation Society. It was constructed in stages between 1969 and 1982 entirely by voluntary labour, many of the volunteers being full-time permanent-way workers from Córas Iompair Éireann, now Iarnród Éireann.

Locomotives

See also
 List of heritage railways in the Republic of Ireland

References

External links 
 Official Website (Archived)
 Facebook site

External links

Stradbally
Rail transport in the Republic of Ireland
Heritage railways in the Republic of Ireland
1969 establishments in Ireland
3 ft gauge railways in Ireland